Magliano is a village in the Italian region of Abruzzo. It is a frazione of the comune  of Torricella Sicura, in the Province of Teramo.

Geography
The village is divided into two parts, Magliano da Piedi (Lower Magliano) and Magliano da Capo (Upper Magliano).  Upper Magliano today consists only of three large uninhabited villas.  One of the villas likely dates back to the 16th century.  The two other dwellings have identical small portals and were likely constructed in the late 18th century or the early years of the successive century. At the time of a 1981 census, Magliano consisted of only 13 families living in 11 residences and had a population of 35 including 18 males and 17 females.  Eleven homes (consisting of 42 rooms) were occupied and fourteen homes (consisting of 41 rooms) were empty.

History
The earliest known records regarding the village date back to 1026 when "Maliano" is mentioned in the context of holdings that Guiberto di Teutone offered to Pietro II, who at that time was the bishop of Teramo-Atri.

In 1056 the area was a church holding occupied by members of the Totoneschi family.

In 1062, Guido di Pietro and Tisone di Longino (nicknamed "Il Corvo" - The Raven) gave their holdings in this area to the Catholic Church.

In 1076 Teutone V, donated his holdings in Magliano to the church.

In 1323 the local church, San Lorenzo in Magliano, was declared a rectorate.

In 1371 local census records indicate that the Church of San Lorenzo was required to make contributions to higher authorities both in livestock and money.

From 1611 to 1614 Magliano was classified a church parish and hosted a Benedictine Abbey.  About 100 people lived nearby at the time.

Later the area of Magliano was subdivided into several "Università agrarie" (an ancient term given to the various communes comprising a large domain).  One of these was Terra Morricana Montagna, which consisted of Magliano and Faognano as well as parts of Acquaratola and Poggio Valle.  A second "Università agrarie" was made up of Valle Piola as well as other portions of Magliano, Acquaratola e Poggio Valle.

Churches of San Lorenzo

Chiesa Vecchia (The Old Church)
The ancient church, now only a pile of rubble located on a hill near the town cemetery, dates back at least to the 14th century.  In medieval times this parish church fell under the auspices of a monastery, San Pietro ad Azzanum in nearby Ioanella.

In a 1681 description of San Lorenzo the church is said to have a main altar with columns, a tapestry depicting a scene from the life of San Francesco, and frescoes (dated 1481) on the cupola and the small baptismal font.  In another description of the church dating back to 1614 mention is made of an oratory with a statue of Saint Catherine of Alexandria.  San Lorenzo at this time was classified as a parish serving Magliano, Faognano and Pomarolo.  In the middle of the 19th century, local religious services were conducted in the chapel of the noble De Dominicis family.  Near the church is a small graveyard that was in use through the middle of the 20th century.  Today ceremonies are still conducted at this location on the Italian holiday honoring the deceased (Festa dei Morti).

Chiesa Nuova (The New Church)
The new San Lorenzo church, belonging to the parish of Borgonovo, was eventually constructed in the area lying between Magliano e Faognano.

"the Saracen Wall"
Located near the old San Lorenzo church, this terraced wall juts out over the Vezzola valley. Legend has it that this wall was constructed as a means of defense against invading Saracen invaders.  If this was its original purpose, it did not function well in this regard however, and any defenders of the land in the area must have been defeated and castle(s) which might have stood nearby razed to the ground.  
Another possibility is that the wall was constructed as a sanctuary during the era in which the Romans were in the process of conquering the indigenous Pretuti tribespeople. The area may have served as the place of worship for an ancient cult before conversion by the Christian leaders and the eventual construction of the San Lorenzo church.

The wall is made of giant sandstone blocks and is still in good condition. The terrace standing behind the wall has views of the Vezzola Valley as far away as the barely visible settlement of Albata.

Iron Age Necropolis
In the early 1900s, a local farmer, Felice Di Pietro, was in the process of cultivating some land near Magliano that had stood fallow for many years.  At a depth of approximately  he unearthed the well-preserved remains of two individuals.  Lying next to each was a foot long iron lance.  Over the years, the remains and armaments of other individuals have been gathered in this area.  In 1950 these items were placed under the protection of the local police authorities in nearby Teramo.

Bibliography
Giammario Sgattoni, L'Abruzzo antico, Lanciano, Carabba, 1979, p. 149.  {It}
Gabriele Di Cesare, Torricella Sicura. Lineamenti storici, Eco editrice, Isola del G. Sasso (Te), 1989, pp. 16, 116-118.
Paesi abbandonati: contributo al recupero del patrimonio edilizio dei Monti della Laga, a cura di Giovanni Di Marco, Lucio Di Blasio, Sabatino Fratini, Associazione Gandhi, EGI, Teramo, Edigrafital, 1991, pp. 108–111.
Teramo e la Valle del Tordino, Teramo, Fondazione Cassa di Risparmio della Provincia di Teramo, 2006, (Documenti dell’Abruzzo teramano, 7, collana diretta da Luisa Franchi dell’Orto), vol. VII-1, pp. 50, 192 e vol. VII-2, p. 695.

External links
La muraglia dei Saraceni 

Frazioni of the Province of Teramo
Cities and towns in Abruzzo